George Bruce Gilroy  (16 September 1889 – 15 July 1916) was a Scottish first-class cricketer and British Army officer.

The son of George and Annie Gilroy, he was born at Clatto House in Blebocraigs, Fife. He was educated at Winchester College, before going up to Magdalen College, Oxford. While studying at Oxford, Gilroy made a single appearance in first-class cricket for Oxford University against the Marylebone Cricket Club at Lord's in 1909. After graduating from Oxford, he joined his father in his jute spinning and manufacturing business. 

Gilroy served in the British Army during the First World War with the Black Watch, being commissioned as a temporary second lieutenant in August 1914, with promotion to temporary lieutenant in February 1915. He was made a temporary captain in October 1915, while commanding a company. He was awarded the Military Cross for actions at the Battle of Loos in September–October 1915. Gilroy was wounded in action at Longueval during the Battle of the Somme on 14 July 1916, dying from his wounds the following day.

References

External links

1889 births
1916 deaths
People from Fife
People educated at Winchester College
Alumni of Magdalen College, Oxford
Scottish cricketers
Oxford University cricketers
Black Watch officers
British Army personnel of World War I
Recipients of the Military Cross
British military personnel killed in the Battle of the Somme
Scottish military personnel